The  is a 2Co+Co1 wheel arrangement electric locomotive type consisting of three locomotives built in 1936 by Hitachi, Kawasaki, and Tōyō Electric in Japan. They were nicknamed "Moomin".

Operations
They were originally intended to haul limited express trains on the Tōkaidō Line. Although based on the earlier EF53 design, the EF55s featured a unique non-symmetrical wheel arrangement with a streamlined cab at only one end. The number 2 end had a traditional-style cab with access deck.

Withdrawal
The need to turn locomotives in regular use proved to be the downfall for this small class, and the locomotives were placed in storage from 1958, and then officially withdrawn in 1964. Following withdrawal, EF55 1 was moved to the former Chūō Railway Institute near Nishi-Kokubunji Station for apprentice training purposes. EF55 3 was cannibalized to donate motors and other components to the ED30 prototype AC electric locomotive, and EF55 2 was also cut up shortly after.

Preserved examples
EF55 1 was designated as an important piece of railway heritage in 1978, and was subsequently restored to running condition, re-entering service in 1986 for use hauling special event trains. It was operated by JR East, based at Takasaki depot, until it was finally withdrawn in December 2008.

See also
 Japan Railways locomotive numbering and classification

References

Electric locomotives of Japan
1067 mm gauge locomotives of Japan
2-C+C-1 locomotives
1500 V DC locomotives
Preserved electric locomotives
Railway locomotives introduced in 1936
Hitachi locomotives
Kawasaki locomotives